Selenduma (Selendüüme) is a rural locality (a selo) in Selenginsky District, Republic of Buryatia, Russia. The population was 2,574 as of 2010. There are 64 streets.

Geography 
Selenduma is located 55 km southwest of Gusinoozyorsk (the district's administrative centre) by road. Shana is the nearest rural locality.

Media coverage 
On 11th May 2022, SBS Dateline published a film online discussing how Russian military and patriotic education programs contribute to convincing young men to join the army. Selenduma is discussed as a small village in which "opportunities are scarce and the military is seen as a way out of poverty." The film claims 23 of Selenduma's young men have been sent to fight in Ukraine.

References 

Rural localities in Selenginsky District